The 2022 World Wheelchair-B Curling Championship was held from November 5 to 10 at the Kisakallio Sports Institute in Lohja, Finland. The top three placing teams (Czech Republic, Denmark and Germany) qualified for the 2023 World Wheelchair Curling Championship in Richmond, British Columbia, Canada.

Teams
The teams are as follows:

Round-robin standings
Final round-robin standings

Round-robin results
All draw times are listed in Eastern European Summer Time (UTC+03:00).

Draw 1
Saturday, November 5, 10:00

Draw 2
Saturday, November 5, 15:00

Draw 3
Sunday, November 6, 9:30

Draw 4
Sunday, November 6, 14:00

Draw 5
Sunday, November 6, 18:30

Draw 6
Monday, November 7, 10:00

Draw 7
Monday, November 7, 15:00

Draw 8
Tuesday, November 8, 9:30

Draw 9
Tuesday, November 8, 14:00

Draw 10
Tuesday, November 8, 18:30

Playoffs

Qualification games
Wednesday, November 9, 14:00

Semifinals
Wednesday, November 9, 18:30

Bronze medal game
Thursday, November 10, 10:00

Final
Thursday, November 10, 15:00

Final standings

References

External links

World Wheelchair Curling Championship
World Wheelchair-B Curling Championship
International curling competitions hosted by Finland
Sports competitions in Lohja
World Wheelchair-B Curling Championship
World Wheelchair-B Curling Championship